Ray Weigh (23 June 1928 – 4 June 2015) was a Welsh footballer who played in the Football League for Aldershot, Bournemouth, Shrewsbury Town and Stockport County.

References

Welsh footballers
English Football League players
1928 births
2015 deaths
Shrewsbury Town F.C. players
AFC Bournemouth players
Stockport County F.C. players
Aldershot F.C. players
Dorchester Town F.C. players
Association football forwards